Braddon may refer to several people and places:


Last name

 Sir Edward Braddon (1829–1904), Australian politician and member of the inaugural Australian House of Representatives
 Sir Henry Braddon (1863–1955), rugby union player and ambassador, son of Edward Braddon
 Laurence Braddon (died 1724), English politician and writer
 Mary Elizabeth Braddon (1835–1915), British novelist
 Paul Braddon (1864–1938), English landscape artist
 Russell Braddon (1921–1995), Australian writer

First name
Braddon Green (born 1959), Australian cricketer
Braddon Mendelson (born 1961), American playwright

Places named after Sir Edward Braddon
 Braddon, Australian Capital Territory, inner suburb of Canberra
 Division of Braddon, Australian Electoral Division
 Division of Braddon (state), electoral division for the Tasmanian House of Assembly

See also
Braddan, parish of the Isle of Man